Ann Downey (born 1957 in Castlecomer, Ireland) is a retired camogie player, winner of 12 All Ireland inter-county medals, captaining the team in 1989 and 1994, and seven All-Ireland club medals with St Paul's and Lisdowney (1) – one more than her sister Angela who was suspended for one final.

Family background
Her father, Shem Downey won an All-Ireland medal with Kilkenny in 1947, playing in one of the greatest finals in hurling history. Her twin sister Angela was cited in 2004 as the greatest player in the history of camogie.

Career
She went to school in Castlecomer before joining her sister in St Brigid’s in Callan. During their careers in the 1970s and '80s Kilkenny completely dominated the game, including winning seven senior All-Irelands in-a-row from 1985 to 1991.

Awards
She was recipient of the Player of the year award in 1991 on her own account and jointly with her sister Angela in 1986 and 1989. In 2010 the Downey sisters received a Lifetime Achievement in Sport award.

Management
In May 2007 she took over management of the Kilkenny camogie team, becoming only the second female manager in senior inter-county camogie, after Wexford's Stellah Sinnott.

Team of the Century
In 2004 when she was overlooked for selection on the Camogie team of the century, her sister Angela snubbed the ceremony.

Other sports
A notable golfer, she also won Irish Veterans' Championship over-40 women's squash singles in 1998.

References

Living people
Kilkenny camogie players
1957 births
Twin sportspeople
Irish twins